Bacillolysin (Bacillus metalloendopeptidase, Bacillus subtilis neutral proteinase, anilozyme P 10, Bacillus metalloproteinase, Bacillus neutral proteinase, megateriopeptidase) is an enzyme. This enzyme catalyses the following chemical reaction

 Similar, but not identical, to that of thermolysin

This enzyme is present in many Bacillus species, including B. subtilis, B. amyloliquefaciens, B. megaterium, B. mesentericus, B. cereus and B. stearothermophilus.

References

External links 
 

EC 3.4.24